The Lithuanian A Lyga 1995–96 was the sixth season of top-tier football in Lithuania. The season started on 13 July 1995 and ended on 16 June 1996. It was contested by 15 teams, and Inkaras-Grifas Kaunas won the championship.

Regular season

Standings

Results

Championship round

Standings

Results

Relegation round

Standings

Results

References 

LFF Lyga seasons
1995 in Lithuanian football
1996 in Lithuanian football
Lith